The 22nd Filmfare Awards South ceremony honoring the winners of the best of South Indian cinema in 1974 was an event held in Shanmukhananda Hall Bombay on 30 March 1975 along with Hindi Awards.

The president of this year's function was the Chief Minister of Maharashtra S. B. Chavan. The chief guest of the evening G. P. Sippy, being indisposed was represented by Mr. B. R. Chopra.

Jury

Awards

Kannada cinema

Malayalam cinema

Tamil cinema

Telugu cinema

Special Awards

Awards presentation

 K. N. Narayan (Best Film Kannada) Received Award from Asrani
 Amrish Puri Received Girish Karnad's award (Best Director Kannada) from Madan Puri
 Aarathi (Best Actress Kannada) Received Award from Jeetendra
 Lokesh (Best Actor Kannada)Received Award from Prema Narayan
 S. R. Puttanna Kanagal Received Producers (Rashi Brothers) award (Special Award) from A. K. Hangal
 N. P. Ali (Best Film Malayalam) Received Award from Dara Singh
 K S Sethumadhavan (Best Director Malayalam) Received Award from Asha Sachdev
 Lakshmi (Best Actress Malayalam) Received Award from Shammi Kapoor
 Kamal Haasan (Best Actor Malayalam) Received Award from Reeta Bhaduri
 K.R.S.Sharma (Best Film Telugu) Received Award from Zarina Wahab
 K. Viswanath (Best Director Telugu) Received Award from Farida Jalal
 Vanisri (Best Actress Telugu) Received Award from B. R. Chopra
 Sobhan Babu (Best Film Telugu) Received Award from Nirupa Roy
 Singeetham Srinivasa Rao (Best Film Tamil) Received Award from Helen
 K. Balachandar (Best Director Tamil) Received Award from Vidya Sinha
 Lakshmi (Best Actress Tamil) Received Award from Amitabh Bachchan

References

 Filmfare Magazine 1975.

General

External links
 
 

Filmfare Awards South